The 2020–21 Ekstraliga was the 46th edition of Poland's highest women's football league. Górnik Łęczna  were the defending champions, since on 22 May 2021 Czarni Sosnowiec secured their 13th title ever.

Teams

Stadiums and locations 
Source

League table

References 

2020–21 domestic women's association football leagues
2020–21 in Polish football